Corrientes Station is a station on Line H of the Buenos Aires Underground.  The station was opened on 6 December 2010 as part of the one-station extension of the line from Once. It served as the line's north terminus until the extension of the line to Las Heras was completed on 18 December 2015. From here, passengers may transfer to the Pueyrredón Station on Line B.

References

External links

Buenos Aires Underground stations
Balvanera
Railway stations opened in 2010
2010 establishments in Argentina